is a former Japanese football player and manager. He played for Japan national team.

Club career
Sano was born in Shizuoka on November 15, 1963. After graduating from Hosei University, he joined Nissan Motors (later Yokohama Marinos) in 1986. From 1988 to 1990, the club won all three major title in Japan; Japan Soccer League, JSL Cup and Emperor's Cup for 2 years in a row. He could not play in the match much for injury. In 1992, Japan Soccer League was folded and founded new league J1 League. However, he retired in 1992 without playing in J1 League.

National team career
On January 27, 1988, Sano debuted for Japan national team against United Arab Emirates. He played full-time in all matches in 1988. He also played at 1990 Asian Games. He played 9 games for Japan until 1990.

Coaching career
After retirement, Sano coached at Yokohama Marinos (1993–96), Yokohama Flügels (1997-98) and Kyoto Purple Sanga (1999-03). He signed with J2 League club Thespa Kusatsu in 2005 and became a manager in 2009. In 2010, he moved to Japan Football League (JFL) club V-Varen Nagasaki. In 2012 season, however the club won the champions and was promoted to J2 League, he resigned end of the season. In 2013, he signed with Regional Leagues club Saurcos Fukui. He moved to JFL club Verspah Oita in 2016. He resigned in 2017.

Club statistics

National team statistics

Managerial statistics

References

External links
 
 Japan National Football Team Database

1963 births
Living people
Hosei University alumni
Association football people from Shizuoka Prefecture
Japanese footballers
Japan international footballers
Japan Soccer League players
J1 League players
Yokohama F. Marinos players
Japanese football managers
J2 League managers
Thespakusatsu Gunma managers
V-Varen Nagasaki managers
Footballers at the 1990 Asian Games
Association football defenders
Asian Games competitors for Japan